Jimmy Bonneau (born March 22, 1985) is a former hockey forward who last played for the Rapid City Rush of the ECHL. He was drafted 241st overall in the 2003 NHL Entry Draft by the Montreal Canadiens. He is an assistant coach for the San Jose Barracuda of the American Hockey League, and served as their co-head coach in 2019–20.

Playing career
Bonneau played major junior hockey starting with the Montreal Rocket in the Quebec Major Junior Hockey League and the next two seasons with the same franchise after it moved to Prince Edward Island. During the 2005–06 season, he played for Long Beach Ice Dogs in ECHL. In the 2006–07 and 2007–08 seasons, he split time with the Hamilton Bulldogs of the American Hockey League and the Cincinnati Cyclones of the ECHL.

After spending two seasons with various organizations, he signed an AHL contract on July 2, 2010, with Hamilton to bring him back to the Canadiens' organization.

On September 27, 2011, Bonneau was signed as a free agent by the AHL's Worcester Sharks. After four seasons with the Worcester Sharks, including their last season as a franchise in 2014–15, Bonneau was a free agent in the off-season signed a one-year deal in the ECHL with the Rapid City Rush on August 18, 2015. He announced his retirement on April 10, 2016.

Coaching career
Bonneau was hired as an associate coach for the San Jose Barracuda in the American Hockey League in 2018 and was named a co-head coach of the team during the 2019–20 season. When regular head coach Roy Sommer returned to his post on September 22, 2020, Bonneau reverted to his assistant duties.

Career statistics

References

External links

1985 births
Living people
Canadian ice hockey left wingers
Cincinnati Cyclones (ECHL) players
Hamilton Bulldogs (AHL) players
Ice hockey people from Quebec
Long Beach Ice Dogs (ECHL) players
Montreal Canadiens draft picks
Montreal Rocket players
P.E.I. Rocket players
People from Baie-Comeau
Portland Pirates players
Rapid City Rush players
Rochester Americans players
San Jose Sharks scouts
Worcester Sharks players